Mehmet Ali Vrioni was an Albanian politician and the vice president of the League of Prizren.

Life 
Mehmet Ali Bey was from the famous landowning bey family of Berat named Vrioni.

In 1877 he became one of the founders of the  Central Committee for Defending Albanian Rights. It was founded in Istanbul in 1877, with the view of obtaining some autonomy for the Albanians in the Ottoman Empire. He was also a founding member of the Committee of Janina which took place in the same year. In 1879 he and Abdyl Frashëri left Preveza, and traveled to Paris, Rome, Vienna and Berlin to seek support for the Albanian cause and submit a memorandum of Albanian demands to the Great Powers. This was the most important effort to promote the rights of the Albanian nation during this period.

References 

Activists of the Albanian National Awakening
Albanian diplomats
People from Berat
Pashas
19th-century Albanian people
Albanians from the Ottoman Empire
Omer